City Stadium is a multi-use stadium in Slutsk, Belarus. It is currently used mostly for football matches and is the home ground of FC Slutsk. The stadium holds 1,896 people.

History
The stadium was originally built in 1935. It was destroyed during World War II and rebuilt in 1948. Further renovations were performed in 2005 (wooden benches replaced by a new seated stand with a capacity of 700) and 2011–2014, when new southern stand was constructed (increasing capacity to the current number of 1,896) and new administrative building opened.

References

External links
Stadium profile at pressball.by

Football venues in Belarus
Slutsk
Buildings and structures in Minsk Region